Valentin Gheorghiu (born 21 March 1928) is a Romanian classical pianist and composer.

Biography

Gheorghiu was born in Galaţi, Romania in 1928. He was first a pupil of Constanța Erbiceanu at the Bucharest Academy of Music and then of Lazare Lévy at the Conservatoire National de Musique in Paris, France. He is one of the leading Romanian pianists of the twentieth century.

He was member of the Romanian Trio, together with Ştefan Gheorghiu and Radu Aldulescu. At the first edition of the George Enescu International Competition in 1958, he won the first prize for the best performance of the third sonata by Enescu, together with his brother the violinist Ştefan Gheorghiu.
Valentin Gheorghiu was a member of the Paloma O'Shea Santander International Piano Competition.

Critics: Modest much too modest, Valentin Gheorghiu is a man of perfect moral conduct: ”he remains in his place”, he does not enjoy being in the light spot, as he is too shy to assert himself. Knowing his value, let us proclaim him as a first class and authentic musician: for over a half a century, the complex musician, pianist and composer, Valentin Gheorghiu, has honestly and impressively represented the Romanian spirit.

Repertoire
Gheorghiu's wide repertoire includes many Romantic composers such as Schumann, Grieg, Brahms, Mendelssohn, Liszt, Chopin, Schubert, Rachmaninoff, in addition to music by Beethoven, as well as modern compositions by Romanian composers, George Enescu, Paul Constantinescu and himself.

Notable recordings 
1960 - Chopin Favourite Works Solo Piano 1960 UK HMV XLP 20021 (Excellent review in Gramophone)
1985 - Schumann, Piano Concerto in A minor, with Emil Simon and the Cluj-Napoca Philharmonic
1986 - Beethoven, Piano Concerto No. 5 (Beethoven), with Emil Simon and the Cluj-Napoca Philharmonic
1987 - Grieg, Piano Concerto in A minor, with Cristian Mandeal and the Cluj-Napoca Philharmonic
1987 - Brahms, Piano Concerto No. 1 (Brahms), with Cristian Mandeal and the Cluj-Napoca Philharmonic
1950s Rachmaninov: Rhapsody on a Theme of Paganini, Liszt Piano Concerto No 1 with Czech Philahrmonic Orchestra and Georges Georgescu - Supraphon, now available as Supraphonline download

External links
 "Valentin Gheorghiu" at Romania on Line

References

1928 births
Romanian classical pianists
Romanian composers
Living people
People from Galați
Conservatoire de Paris alumni
21st-century classical pianists